Santiurde de Reinosa is a municipality located in the autonomous community of Cantabria, Spain.

Localities
Its 317 inhabitants (INE, 2008) are distributed in the villages of:
 Lantueno, 131 hab.
 Rioseco, 46 hab.
 Santiurde de Reinosa (Capital), 95 hab.
 Somballe, 44 hab.

References

Municipalities in Cantabria